Brian Dabul and Izak van der Merwe were the defending champions, but chose not to play this year.
Duilio Beretta and Renzo Olivo won the title, defeating Víctor Estrella and João Souza 6–3, 6–0 in the final.

Seeds

Draw

Draw

References
 Main Draw

Manta Open - Doubles
2012 Doubles